The Literary World was a magazine of literary criticism, published from Boston by S.R. Crocker, which offered "Choice readings from the best new books, and critical reviews". An edition was also published from London. The magazine was first published in June 1870 and continued until 1904 when it was incorporated into The Critic.

See also
The Literary World, New York, 1847–53.

References 

Magazines established in 1870
Magazines disestablished in 1904
Magazines published in Boston
Defunct literary magazines published in the United States